Ole Skouboe (born 6 September 1949) is a Danish former football player and manager who played as a forward. He later worked as a journalist at Nordjyske Medier.

References

External links
 
 
 Hvidovre IF Profile
 Skouboe færdig i Aris - BT
 Grækernes danske helt

1949 births
Living people
Danish men's footballers
Association football forwards
Denmark international footballers
Denmark under-21 international footballers
Kolding IF players
VSK Aarhus players
Hvidovre IF players
Helsingborgs IF players
Havnar Bóltfelag players
Danish football managers
Viborg FF managers
Aris Thessaloniki F.C. managers
GÍ Gøta managers
FK Jerv managers
Danish expatriate men's footballers
Danish expatriate football managers
Danish expatriate sportspeople in Sweden
Expatriate footballers in Sweden
Danish expatriate sportspeople in the United States
Expatriate soccer players in the United States
Danish expatriate sportspeople in Greece
Expatriate footballers in Greece
Expatriate football managers in Greece
Danish expatriate sportspeople in Norway
Expatriate football managers in Norway